Matjaž Debelak (born 27 August 1965, in Braslovče) is a Slovenian former ski jumper who competed for Yugoslavia from 1986 to 1990.

His best-known successes were at the 1988 Winter Olympics, where he earned two medals with a silver in the team large hill event and a bronze in the individual large hill event. Debelak's best finish at the FIS Nordic World Ski Championships was a 6th in the individual normal hill in 1989.

External links
 . Slovenia
 

1965 births
Living people
Yugoslav male ski jumpers
Slovenian male ski jumpers
Ski jumpers at the 1988 Winter Olympics
Olympic ski jumpers of Yugoslavia
Olympic silver medalists for Yugoslavia
Olympic bronze medalists for Yugoslavia
Olympic medalists in ski jumping
People from the Municipality of Braslovče
Medalists at the 1988 Winter Olympics